The Italian Somaliland lira also called the Somali lira, was a special version of the Italian lira minted in Italian Somaliland between 1925 and 1926.

Data 

The "Italian Somali Lira" replaced the Italian Somaliland rupia at a rate of 8 lire = 1 rupia. Only coins of £5 and £10 were issued, which circulated alongside Italian coins and banknotes. From 1938, banknotes for the Italian East African lira also circulated. The coin circulation officially lasted until 1941.

Coins 

In 1925, silver coins in denominations of 5 and 10 lire were issued.

They were slightly larger than the 5 and 10 lire coins introduced in Italy the following year. The issue was approved by the Royal Decree of 18 June 1925, n. 1143, contextually put out over the former "Somalia Rupia". To the reverse there was the Arms of Somalia era: lion passant and three six-pointed stars. The Coat of Arms, between two branches, was crowned. Legends were only in Italian.

Notes

Bibliography 

 
 Mauri, Arnaldo (1967). Il mercato del credito in Etiopia, Giuffrè ed. Milano, 1967.

External links 
 Currencies of "Somalia Italiana" (in Italian)

Currencies of Somalia
Modern obsolete currencies
1925 establishments in the Italian Empire
Lira